Burma competed at the 1964 Summer Olympics in Tokyo, Japan. Eleven competitors, all men, took part in eleven events in five sports.

Athletics

Men
Track & road events

Boxing

Men

Shooting

Two shooters represented Burma in 1964.
Open

Swimming

Men

Weightlifting

Men

References

External links
Official Olympic Reports

Nations at the 1964 Summer Olympics
1964
1964 in Burmese sport